The anteater chat or northern anteater-chat (Myrmecocichla aethiops) is a species of bird in the family Muscicapidae.It is found in Burkina Faso, Cameroon, Central African Republic, Chad, Gambia, Kenya, Mali, Mauritania, Niger, Nigeria, Senegal, Sudan, and Tanzania. Its natural habitats are dry savanna, subtropical or tropical dry lowland grassland, and subtropical or tropical high-altitude grassland.

It has been observed to nest in abandoned wells in Nigeria

References

External links
Image at ADW

anteater chat
Birds of the Sahel
anteater chat
Taxonomy articles created by Polbot